Aco Jonovski (born 29 December 1980) is a retired Macedonian handball player.

References

Macedonian male handball players
1980 births
Living people
Sportspeople from Bitola
Macedonian expatriate sportspeople in Turkey
Macedonian expatriate sportspeople in Denmark
Macedonian expatriate sportspeople in Spain
Macedonian expatriate sportspeople in Bosnia and Herzegovina
Macedonian expatriate sportspeople in Germany
Macedonian expatriate sportspeople in Switzerland
Expatriate handball players in Turkey
Handball-Bundesliga players
Beşiktaş J.K. Handball Team players